The Gingerbread Man is a 1998 American legal thriller film directed by Robert Altman and based on a discarded John Grisham manuscript. The film stars Kenneth Branagh, Embeth Davidtz, Robert Downey Jr., Tom Berenger, Daryl Hannah, Famke Janssen, and Robert Duvall.

Plot

Rick Magruder (Kenneth Branagh) is a divorced lawyer with a reputation for underhanded dealings and protecting criminals. After another successful trial, Magruder celebrates at a party hosted by his firm, becoming increasingly drunk. As he stumbles out of the party, he has a chance meeting with a woman named Mallory Doss (Embeth Davidtz), a waitress at the party who seems to have lost her car. Rick drives the woman to her home, where her car has been already parked, seemingly by her father, Dixon Doss (Robert Duvall). Rick and Mallory walk into the house arguing about her abusive father. Mallory carelessly undresses in front of him, after which they spend the night together.

The next day, Mallory asks him to file suit against her father because of his dangerous behavior. Having started a relationship with Mallory, Rick agrees and is successful in having Dixon put on trial thanks to favors from his staff, including his investigator, Clyde Pell (Robert Downey Jr.). Mallory's ex-husband, Pete Randle (Tom Berenger) also takes the stand, to testify about his former father-in-law's erratic behavior. Dixon appeals to the judge, claiming that the charges against him are fabricated and exaggerated, but the judge sentences him to a mental institution. Upon being taken away, Dixon attempts to attack Magruder, vowing revenge. With her father institutionalized, Magruder and Mallory continue their relationship, but not long after, Dixon is able to escape from the institution. Scared of retaliation, Magruder assigns Pell to guard Mallory while he attempts to gain support from the police to apprehend Dixon. The police are unhelpful, even after Dixon and his friends set Mallory's car on fire, due to the many cases Magruder has won against them.

A short time later, Magruder receives an unmarked letter containing pictures of his children with their faces cut out of them. Worried for his children, he decides to take them out of school, despite not having full custody of his children and needing his wife's permission to take them. Over the objections of the teachers, Magruder escapes with his children, after assaulting a school employee. Magruder calls Pell, impelling him to find Dixon Doss. Pell informs Magruder there is now a warrant out for his arrest. Magruder takes the children to a motel. He goes outside the room to call his wife (Famke Janssen) to assure her that he has done what he has for their safety, but during the call, Magruder's children are apparently taken by Dixon's crew, and he is forced to rendezvous with Mallory so that she can lead him to her father's house. After they arrive, Magruder forces Dixon into a standoff where the older man is killed with a shot through the throat. Mallory then yells that Dixon's men are escaping with Magruder's children, and he is forced to give chase. However, upon catching them, his children are not with them, having been turned in to the police office hours earlier. Magruder is arrested by the police and Mallory is picked up back at her father's house, which is now in flames.

In the aftermath, Magruder is charged with murder and is threatened with disbarment. Realizing that he has been set up, Magruder has Clyde look into Mallory's background, suspicious that she might have something to gain from her father's death. The search reveals that Dixon's land isn't worth much, but the timber (black walnut) on it is worth millions, and on top of that, Mallory had never actually divorced Pete Randle. With no will found, Mallory, and by relation, Randle, are granted ownership of Dixon's estate. Suspicious of Randle, Clyde and Magruder track the man down. Clyde is killed by Randle, and Magruder is forced into a desperate struggle in the middle of a violent hurricane. While the two grapple with one another, Mallory arrives and shoots Randle in the back with a flare gun. Her husband falls into the flood waters below, dead. Mallory claims that she had no idea about her husband's plans, but Magruder is still suspicious. He removes another flare from her flare gun, and when he returns it to her, she attempts to kill Magruder with it. Realizing that Mallory and Randle were working together, Magruder signals the police, who arrest Mallory. As the film concludes, Magruder decides not to fight the charges against him, accepting a plea deal that involves community service. In the courtroom, he spies Mallory being led away in handcuffs, who gives him a knowing look.

Cast

 Kenneth Branagh as Rick Magruder
 Embeth Davidtz as Mallory Doss
 Robert Downey Jr. as Clyde Pell
 Tom Berenger as Pete Randle
 Daryl Hannah as Lois Harlan
 Robert Duvall as Dixon Doss
 Famke Janssen as Leeanne Magruder
 Jesse James as Jeff Magruder
 Mae Whitman as Libby Magruder
 Wilbur Fitzgerald as Judge Russo

Production
The film was based on an original story by John Grisham that was subsequently adapted into screenplay form. Kenneth Branagh liked the story and agreed to do the film but only if a highly regarded director signed on as well. In July 1996, it was announced that Luis Mandoki was to direct the film, with Annette Bening in the female lead, and it was to have been filmed in Memphis, Tennessee. However, when Bening fell pregnant, she had to drop out, with Mandoki departing shortly afterwards. Branagh went to work on The Proposition while the producers looked for another director. John Dahl was offered the film before the producers settled on Robert Altman. Altman wanted to work with Branagh but only, as he told him, "If we can fool the audience by not making you the hero, by making you flawed."

Once Altman came on board, he heavily re-worked the script, giving credit to the pseudonymous Al Hayes. Altman said in an interview, "I just wanted to change the elements of these kinds of stories as much as I could and then I wanted to stay out of the courtroom." Altman changed the setting to Savannah, Georgia, and added the threat of a hurricane throughout the movie. For the look of the film, Altman was inspired by The Night of the Hunter.

Principal photography would occur during early 1997. In addition to Two Girls and a Guy, which was also shot in the early months of 1997, the film was Robert Downey Jr.'s first acting role after a 1996 drug arrest. It has been said that Downey Jr. "didn't even read the script" when he accepted the role.

Release
The Gingerbread Man was intended to open in the fall of 1997 but was delayed after an audience test screening reportedly went poorly. Polygram Films brought in an outsider to re-edit the movie without informing Altman, and claimed that his version "lacked tension and suffered from an inappropriate music score". At one point, the publicized squabble between the studio and the filmmaker got so bad that he wanted his name taken off the film. According to Branagh, the film previewed well but not up to the expectations of the studio. He said in an interview: "There's this enormous pressure to wrap everything up neatly and to resist things that stray from formula. Anything that suggests complexity in a character makes them unsympathetic in the eyes of some people, and they see that as a great crime." Polygram backed down when their version tested worse than Altman's in a preview. The studio was upset that Altman had completely rewritten Grisham's script so that it was more critical about lawyers.

Years later, Ray Pride interviewed Altman about the post-production debacle and he replied, "Well, it's criminal, their treatment of that film. There was a vindictive order from the guy who was running [Polygram Films], he was so pissed off with me, he literally told them, 'I want that movie killed.' We're talking to lawyers, but it's almost impossible to win a lawsuit. You can't prove what a film could have done. They were just pissed off because it didn't test the way they wanted it to with the teenagers, y'know, in those malls."

Reception
In his review for the San Francisco Chronicle, Mick LaSalle wrote, "If it weren't for Altman's touches, The Gingerbread Man would be a mediocre thriller. Even with them, it can't be more than a top-notch genre film, but top-notch is top-notch." Jay Carr of The Boston Globe said that the film "is fun junk...We're talking claptrap here, but it's more enjoyable than it has any business being, thanks to director Robert Altman and star Kenneth Branagh." In his review for The Independent, Boyd Tonkin wrote, "It does not sprawl or wander as the Altman of old would have. Neither does it ever really catch alight. This is a waterlogged venture in more ways than one." Roger Ebert and Gene Siskel gave the film two thumbs up, citing "brilliant filmmaking". 
The film holds a 59% rating on Rotten Tomatoes based on 46 reviews.

References

External links
 
 
 

1998 films
1998 independent films
1990s legal films
1990s thriller drama films
American independent films
American legal drama films
American thriller drama films
1990s English-language films
Films scored by Mark Isham
Films based on works by John Grisham
Films directed by Robert Altman
American courtroom films
Films based on American novels
Legal thriller films
PolyGram Filmed Entertainment films
Films shot in Savannah, Georgia
1998 drama films
1990s American films